Helen's Reef is a series of skerries in the North Atlantic,  northeast of the larger islet of Rockall and outcrop of Hasselwood Rock, within the United Kingdom's exclusive economic zone. The skerries are covered at high tide or in rough seas, and are often only visible as breaking waves. 

It is within the  radius territorial waters of Rockall, which is claimed by the UK as of 1955 and incorporated into the UK by the Island of Rockall Act 1972.  This claim was previously long disputed by Ireland, but the dispute is resolved as of 31 March 2014.

History 
In 1812 the survey vessel Leonidas foundered on the reef.

It was named for the brigantine Helen of Dundee, bound for Quebec, which foundered at Hasselwood Rock in 1824. The vessel struck between nine and ten o'clock on the morning of 17 April. After some twelve hours struggling to keep her afloat and make for safety, water had almost filled the hold. The captain ordered the passengers onto the deck with warm clothing. Difficulty was experienced launching the boats, and one had to be repaired after being holed on the stock of the kedge anchor; "the crew left most of the passengers to drown, including seven women and six children". 

On 28 June 1904 the 3,318 ton DFDS steamer , with 795 people including 240 children on board bound for New York,  foundered on the reef. 635 lives were lost with most of the 163 survivors being taken to Stornoway.

References

Rockall
Reefs of the Atlantic Ocean
Skerries of Scotland
Landforms of the Outer Hebrides
Reefs of Scotland